Abronia campbelli, commonly known as Campbell's alligator lizard, is species of critically endangered arboreal alligator lizard in the family Anguidae. Abronia campbelli is endemic to eastern Guatemala.

Etymology
The specific name, campbelli, is in honor of American herpetologist Jonathan A. Campbell.

Habitat

Reproduction
A. campbelli is viviparous.

References

Further reading
Ariano-Sánchez, Daniel; Torres-Almazán, Monica (2010). "Rediscovery of Abronia campbelli (Sauria: Anguidae) from a Pine-Oak Forest in Southeastern Guatemala: Habitat Characterization, Natural History, and Conservation Status". Herpetological Review 41 (3): 290–292.
Brodie ED Jr, Savage RF (1993). "A new species of Abronia (Squamata: Anguidae) from a dry oak forest in eastern Guatemala". Herpetologica 49 (4): 420–427. (Abronia campbelli, new species).
Lock, Brad; Torres, Monica (2016). "Projekt zum Schutz der vom Aussterben bedrohten Baumschleiche Abronia campbelli im Osten Guatemalas ". Terraria-Elaphe 62 (6): 72–79. (in German).

Reptiles described in 1993
Abronia